Michael John Richardson (born 13 July 1949), a former Australian politician, was a Member of the New South Wales Legislative Assembly representing the electorates of The Hills between 1993 and 2007 and Castle Hill between 2007 and 2011 for the Liberal Party.

Richardson was educated at North Sydney Boys High School and the University of Sydney.  He worked for 23 years as a journalist and in publishing.  He is married with two adult children.

Notes

 

Members of the New South Wales Legislative Assembly
Liberal Party of Australia members of the Parliament of New South Wales
Living people
1949 births
People educated at North Sydney Boys High School
21st-century Australian politicians